Kristin Krammer (born 24 May 2002) is an Austrian footballer who plays as a goalkeeper for ÖFB-Frauenliga club SV Neulengbach and the Austria women's national team.

Club career
Krammer has played for Carinthians Spittal, SKN St. Pölten and Neulengbach in Austria.

International career
Krammer made her senior debut for Austria on 23 February 2021 in a 1–0 friendly win over Slovakia.

References

External links

2002 births
Living people
Austrian women's footballers
Women's association football goalkeepers
FSK St. Pölten-Spratzern players
SV Neulengbach (women) players
ÖFB-Frauenliga players
Austria women's international footballers